The 2005 Hamburg Sea Devils season was the inaugural season for the franchise in the NFL Europe League (NFLEL). The team was led by head coach Jack Bicknell, and played its home games at AOL Arena in Hamburg, Germany. They finished the regular season in fourth place with a record of five wins and five losses.

Offseason

Free agent draft

Personnel

Staff

Roster

Schedule

Standings

Game summaries

Week 1: at Cologne Centurions

Week 2: at Berlin Thunder

Week 3: vs Rhein Fire

Week 4: at Frankfurt Galaxy

Week 5: vs Cologne Centurions

Week 6: at Rhein Fire

Week 7: vs Amsterdam Admirals

Week 8: vs Berlin Thunder

Week 9: at Amsterdam Admirals

Week 10: vs Frankfurt Galaxy

Notes

References

Hamburg
Hamburg Sea Devils seasons